The Princess is a 1966 Swedish drama film directed by Åke Falck. It was entered into the 5th Moscow International Film Festival where Grynet Molvig won the award for Best Actress.

Cast
 Grynet Molvig as Seija (as Ann-Kristin Molvig)
 Lars Passgård as Gunnar
 Monica Nielsen as Pirjo
 Birgitta Valberg as Doctor
 Tore Bengtsson as Doctor
 Thore Segelström as Doctor
 Tore Lindwall as Obstetrician
 Axel Düberg as Vicar

References

External links
 
 

1966 films
1966 drama films
Swedish drama films
1960s Swedish-language films
Swedish black-and-white films
1960s Swedish films